Closing Time is a 1994 novel by Joseph Heller, written as a sequel to his popular 1961 novel Catch-22. It takes place in New York City in the 1990s and revisits some characters of the original, including Yossarian, Milo Minderbinder, and Chaplain Tappman.

The book has two stories that are interwoven throughout: that of Yossarian in the last stages of his life, and that of Sammy Singer and Lew Rabinowitz, two men from Coney Island who also fought in World War II (the Sammy Singer character makes a brief appearance in Catch-22 as the tailgunner aboard Yossarian's bomber who kept waking up and fainting when he saw Yossarian trying to attend to the wounds of Snowden).

As with Catch-22, the topic of death is omnipresent, only in this case from usually age-related illnesses, in particular cancer rather than dying in battle, as with its predecessor. One notable inconsistency in the book is that although Yossarian was 28 in Catch-22, which took place in 1944, in Closing Time Yossarian is 68, and the time of Catch-22 is referred to as "50 years ago". When asked about the inconsistency in an interview with The New York Times, Heller replied, "I know, but I decided to ignore it."

There is a man mentioned by Lew named "Vonnegut", whom he met while in Dresden. This is a reference to Kurt Vonnegut's experiences in the Bombing of Dresden and his book Slaughterhouse-Five. A character named Joey Heller is also mentioned who, like the author, was a bombardier during the Second World War and suffers from Guillain–Barré syndrome.

Plot

References

1994 American novels
American comedy novels
American satirical novels
Catch-22
Novels by Joseph Heller
Novels set in New York City
Sequel novels
Simon & Schuster books